The Keith–O'Brien Building (also known as the Keith Building) is a historic commercial building in downtown Salt Lake City, Utah, United States, that is listed on the National Register of Historic Places (NRHP).

Description
The building, located at 242–256 South Main Street, is a department store building that was built in 1902. It was designed by architect Frederick Albert Hale and was built for $150,000 (equivalent to $ million in ) .

According to its NRHP nomination, it is important in part as "an important monument to a leading Utah developer, businessman, statesman, and philanthropist, David Keith."

It was listed on the National Register of Historic Places in 1977.

See also

 National Register of Historic Places listings in Salt Lake City

References

External links

Commercial buildings on the National Register of Historic Places in Utah
Commercial buildings completed in 1902
Buildings and structures in Salt Lake City
Department stores on the National Register of Historic Places
National Register of Historic Places in Salt Lake City